South Church is a village just south of Bishop Auckland in County Durham, England.

St Andrew's church  is the largest church in County Durham and a Grade I listed building. The church was built in the thirteenth century and acted as a collegiate church. The astronomer and mathematician Thomas Wright was buried in  the churchyard of St Andrew's after his death in 1786.

South Church railway station opened in 1842 but was in operation for only about three years. Nowadays the area is served by Bishop Auckland railway station.

References

Villages in County Durham